The Lost Notebooks of Hank Williams is a 2011 album by folk, country, and rock artists who set music to lyrics by country musician Hank Williams. The album was released on October 4, 2011.

Background
Williams died suddenly in 1953 at the age of 29 while traveling to his next scheduled concert on New Years Day in Canton, Ohio. Inside his Cadillac, the police found the unfinished handwritten lyrics to songs that Williams had never recorded.

In 2006, a janitor working for Sony/ATV Music Publishing claimed to have found Williams' unfinished lyrics inside a Sony-owned dumpster. She said that she had sold Williams' notes to a representative of the Honky-Tonk Hall of Fame and the Rock-N-Roll Roadshow. She was then accused of theft, but the charges were dropped when a judge determined the janitor's version of events to be true. The unfinished lyrics were later returned to Sony/ATV, which handed them to Bob Dylan in 2008 to complete the songs for an album release. Dylan completed one song; others were completed by Alan Jackson, Norah Jones, Jack White, Lucinda Williams, Vince Gill, Rodney Crowell, Patty Loveless, Holly Williams, Levon Helm, Jakob Dylan, Sheryl Crow and Merle Haggard.

Reception

Neil Spencer in The Observer wrote, "The air of reverence hangs heavily, with Williams's droll humour and proto-rockabilly style largely absent [...] An entertaining exercise, though of Hank's celebrated yodel there is, alas, no sign." Entertainment Weekly described the artist performances as "original melodies, some too wan for the strength of the lyrics, which range from the deeply romantic to the   corrosively aggressive."

The Daily Telegraph rated the album four stars out of five with a favorable review, saying, "It is rare that any posthumous release becomes an essential part of an artist’s canon, and the very simplicity of Williams’s oeuvre mitigates against declaring classic status for lovingly crafted yet essentially minor songs. But the album is a beauty, none the less, the care put into it confirming Williams’s exalted position in the tower of song". Stephen Thomas Erlewine of Allmusic gave the album 4 out of 5 stars, saying that the artists selected "treat it with respect but not undue reverence, something that unites all the artists here", and called it "something real, imperfect, and resonant".

Track listing

Chart performance

References

Cited books

2011 compilation albums
Columbia Records compilation albums
Country albums by American artists
Hank Williams tribute albums